Highland Towers may refer to:

 Highland Towers Apartments, in Pittsburgh, Pennsylvania
 Highland Towers collapse, in Ampang, Malaysia